The Lac du Rat Musqué is a lake located between the municipalities of Sainte-Cécile-de-Whitton and Lac-Drolet, Le Granit Regional County Municipality, in Estrie, in Quebec, in Canada. It is the source of the Madisson River, a tributary of the Chaudière River and a sub-tributary of the St. Lawrence River.

Geography 
The lake contains speckled trout.

History 
Around the 18th century, Anishinabeg lived around the lake, where they mainly cultivated corn. Between 1850 and 1900 a railway passed near the lake, so a community that could develop there was founded around the lake. In 2010 recreational activities took place on and around the lake, we also note a dozen houses with a direct view of it.

Tourism 
Located near the Route des Sommets, in a location surrounded by nature and mountains, the area is ideal for hiking, camping, and outdoor activities.

References 

Lakes of Estrie
Le Granit Regional County Municipality